Goudomp Department is one of the 45 departments of Senegal, one of three making up the Sédhiou Region. It was created in 2008 along with the Sédhiou Region, which was formerly part of the Kolda Region.

There are four communes in the department: Goudomp, Samine, Tanaff and Diattacounda.

The rural districts (communautés rurales) comprise:
 Arrondissement of Djibanar:
 Yarang Balante
 Mangaroungou Santo
 Simbandi Balante
 Djibanar
 Kaour
 Arrondissement of Simbandi Brassou:
 Diouboudou
 Simbandi Brassou
 Baghère
 Niagha
 Arrondissement of Karantaba:
 Karantaba
 Kolibantang

Historic sites 

 Mosque of Karantaba
 Mosque of Baghère

References

Departments of Senegal
Sédhiou Region